The 7th Armoured Division was an armoured division of the French Army. The division was active during the Cold War and some time after the fall of the Berlin Wall, before being disbanded. Its traditions were carried on by the 7th Armoured Brigade.

History 
The division was created in 1955 as the 7e Division Mecanique Rapide (7th Fast Mechanised Division), commanded by General François Huet and based in Constance (Germany). It was an experimental formation of the French Army and served to test of new structures and tactics for the expected nuclear battlefield and also new weapons, being the first large unit equipped with the new, light-weight Panhard EBR armoured cars and AMX-13 tanks.

In early 1956 the division was transferred to French North Africa, where its soldiers served as infantry supporting French operations in the Algerian War. In late 1956 the division was hurriedly reunited with its tanks and armoured cars to take part in Operation Musketeer, the invasion of Egypt by Franco-British forces. It then returned to Algeria where it remained until 1961.

The division was transferred to Metropolitan France, with its headquarters at Besançon, forming part of I Corps. The division was renamed, becoming the 7e Division Légère Blindée (7th Light Armoured Division).  It became simply the 7e Division Blindée (7th Armoured Division) in 1963 when the 8th Motorised Infantry Brigade joined the division. In the 1970s the French Army returned to the idea of smaller, more flexible divisions, the idea which had originally led to the creation of the division. It was selected to test the new ideas, and its 7th Mechanised Brigade did much of the experimental work.

With the adoption of the new divisional structure in 1977, the 7th Armoured Division was dissolved and the new 7th Armoured, as well as the 4th Armoured and 8th Infantry Divisions, was created from the remains. The new division continued to be based at Besançon. It was later reassigned from I Corps, at Metz to III Corps at Lille. It too was reorganised on 1 July 1999, as part of the changes which followed the end of the Cold War and the professionalisation of the French Army, to create the new 7th Armoured Brigade which carries on the traditions of the 7th Armoured.

Composition

1955 to 1963 
 2e Régiment de Dragons (2e RD)
 Régiment Colonial de Chasseurs de Chars (RCCC)
 3e Régiment de Chasseurs d'Afrique (3e RCA)
 21e Régiment d'Infanterie Coloniale (21e RIC)
 72e Groupe d'Artillerie
 457e Groupe d'Artillerie
 57e Bataillon du Génie
 57e Bataillon des services
 57e Compagnie de quartier général
 57e Compagnie de réparation divisionnaire
 2e Groupe aéromobile

1963 to 1977 
As 7e Brigade Mécanisé of 7e Division Blindée
 1er Régiment de Dragons (1er RD) Armoured Regiment
 30e Régiment de Dragons (30e RD) Armoured Regiment
 35e Régiment d'Infanterie (35e RI) Infantry Regiment
 1er Régiment d'Artillerie (1er RA) Artillery Regiment

1977 to 1999 
As 7e Division Blindée
 3e Régiment de Cuiriassiers (3e RC) Armoured Regiment
 1er Régiment de Dragons (1er RD) Armoured Regiment
 5e Régiment de Dragons (5e RD) Armoured Regiment
 35e Régiment d'Infanterie (35e RI) Infantry Regiment
 170e Régiment d'Infanterie (170e RI) Infantry Regiment
 (to 1990) 30e Groupe de Chasseurs (30e GC) Infantry Regiment
 1er Régiment d'Artillerie (1er RA) Artillery Regiment
 (to 1993) 60e Régiment d'Artillerie (40e RA) Artillery Regiment
 (from 1993) 32e Régiment d'Artillerie (32e RA) Artillery Regiment
 19e Régiment du Génie (19e RG) Engineer Regiment
 7e Régiment de commandement et de Soutien (7e RCS) Command and Signals Regiment

References
 

Armored divisions of France
Military units and formations established in 1955
Military units and formations disestablished in 1999
1955 establishments in France